Zaouia Sidi Moussa is a village, and religious center, in the commune of Bordj Omar Driss, in In Amenas District, Illizi Province, Algeria.

References

Neighbouring towns and cities

Populated places in Illizi Province